The Israeli Air Force Museum is located at Hatzerim Airbase in the Negev desert.

The museum was established in 1977 and has been open to the public since 1991. The museum displays a variety of Israeli Air Force and foreign aircraft, as well as anti aircraft arms.

Aircraft on display

Israeli air force aircraft

 Aérospatiale Alouette II
 Aerospatiale Super Frelon
 Aerospatiale Super Frelon
 Augusta / Bell UH-1 - #002
 Augusta / Bell UH-1 - #026
 Avia S-199
 Beechcraft Queen Air
 Bell AH-1G Cobra
 Bell AH-1 Cobra
 Bell 206
 Boeing KC-97 - #039 Masada
 Boeing KC-97
 Boeing 707 - Operation Thunderbolt flying command post
 Boeing 707 - radar testbed
 Boeing-Stearman Kaydet - maintained in airworthy condition
 Britten Norman Islander
 Cessna 172
 Consolidated PBY Catalina
 Dassault Mirage III - #158
 Dassault Mirage III - #159, Re-acquired from Argentina
 Dassault Mystere IV
 Dassault Mystere IV - #60
 Dassault Ouragan - #49
 Dassault Ouragan - #80
 Dassault Super Mystere
 De Havilland Dragon Rapide
 De Havilland Tiger Moth
 Dornier Do 27
 Dornier Do 28
 Douglas DC-3 - #038
 Fokker S-11
 Fouga Magister
 Fouga Magister - IAI Tzukit variant
 General Dynamics F-16 Fighting Falcon - #107 with 6.5 kill markings
 Gloster Meteor - #06
 Gloster Meteor - Gate guard
 Gloster Meteor - NF-13 Variant
 Gloster Meteor - NF-13 Variant
 Gloster Meteor - #15
 Gloster Meteor - #18
 Grumman E-2C - #944
 Hughes 500

 IAI Arava - #203
 IAI Kfir - #712
 IAI Kfir TC - #988, modified Mirage IIIB
 IAI Kfir - #529, gate guard
 IAI Kfir - #451 Prism reconnaissance variant
 IAI Kfir - #310, TC-2 variant
 IAI Lavi
 IAI Nesher
 IAI Westwind - modified testbed aircraft
 McDonnell Douglas A-4 Skyhawk
 McDonnell Douglas F-15 Eagle
 McDonnell Douglas F-4 Phantom II - #323
 McDonnell Douglas F-4 Phantom II - transparent panels display aircraft interior
 McDonnell Douglas F-4 Phantom II - #498, F-4E(S) reconnaissance aircraft
 McDonnell Douglas F-4 Phantom II - Kurnass 2000 #614
 McDonnell Douglas F-4 Phantom II - #229 Super Phantom
 McDonnell Douglas F-4 Phantom II - #297, Manat test aircraft
 McDonnell Douglas RF-4E Phantom II - #485
 North American Harvard - #14
 North American Harvard - #001, maintained in airworthy condition
 North American P-51D Mustang
 North American P-51D Mustang
 Nord Noratlas - #045, 4X-FAE
 Pilatus PC-6
 Piper Super Cub
 Republic RC-3 Seabee
 Sikorsky CH-53 - #471
 Sikorsky S-55 - #03
 Sikorsky S-58 - #07
 SOCATA Trinidad
 Sud-Ouest Vautour - #09 Hamashhit (Defiler)
 Sud-Ouest Vautour - #33 Big Brother
 Sud-Ouest Vautour - #70 Phantomas
 Supermarine Spitfire - LF Mk.IXe TE554, The Black Spitfire, former Israeli Air Force 20–57, maintained in airworthy condition
 Supermarine Spitfire - LF Mk.IXe SL653, former Israeli Air Force 20-28
 Supermarine Spitfire - F Mk.IXe EN145, former Israeli Air Force 20-78
 Taylorcraft Auster

Foreign Types

 Aerospatiale Gazelle - Former Syrian aircraft, captured 1982.
 De Havilland Vampire - liveried as Lebanese Air Force aircraft
 De Havilland Venom - liveried as Iraqi Air Force aircraft
 Hawker Hunter - Former Chilean example (J-747, ex-XF445), liveried as Royal Jordanian Air Force aircraft.
 Grumman TBM-3E Avenger - BuNo. 69355
 MiG-15 - former Polish aircraft, bearing Egyptian livery.
 MiG-17 
 MiG-21 - #007, liveried as Operation Diamond aircraft
 MiG-21 - #339, two seat variant, acquired 2011 from IAI via Romania. ex Madagascar AF aircraft.
 MiG-23 - Former Syrian aircraft, defected 1989.
 Mil Mi-24 - #4010, Acquired 2004

Partial remains

Bristol Beaufighter - remains of Israeli aircraft shot down 1948, retrieved 1994.
De Havilland Mosquito
Hiller 360
 MiG-17 - remains of Syrian aircraft shot down over the Sea of Galilee in 1966
MiG-19 - Tail of Egyptian aircraft shot down in 1967
Noorduyn Norseman
Sukhoi Su-7 - Tail of Egyptian aircraft shot down during Yom Kippur War
Tupolev Tu-16 - remains of Iraqi aircraft shot down in 1967

Anti Aircraft Weapons

Anti Aircraft Artillery
 M163 VADS
 MIM-72 Chaparral
 ZSU-23-4 Shilka
 ZSU-57-2

Missiles and AA systems
 SA-2 Guideline - mobile launcher
 SA-2 Guideline - static launcher

Other Vehicles
 Plymouth Valiant
 Citroën 2CV
 ZIL-157
 Willys M38A1

References

Bibliography

External links 

 Website
 AbPic

Air force museums
Israeli Air Force
Israeli Air Force units
Jewish military history
Military and war museums in Israel
Negev
Museums established in 1977
1977 establishments in Israel